Scoparia axiolecta is a moth in the family Crambidae. It was described by Turner in 1922. It is found in Australia, where it has been recorded from Tasmania.

The wingspan is 18 mm. The forewings are white with blackish markings and slight blackish irroration. The hindwings are whitish-grey.

References

Moths described in 1922
Scorparia